The 2016 Missouri Attorney General election was held on November 8, 2016, to elect the Attorney General of Missouri, concurrently with the 2016 U.S. presidential election, as well as elections to the United States Senate and elections to the United States House of Representatives and various state and local elections. Republican Josh Hawley defeated the Democratic nominee Teresa Hensley.

Incumbent Democratic Attorney General Chris Koster did not run for re-election to a third term in office, but was instead the unsuccessful Democratic nominee for Governor.

Democratic primary

Candidates

Declared
 Teresa Hensley, former Cass County Prosecuting Attorney and nominee for MO-04 in 2012
 Jake Zimmerman, St. Louis County Assessor, former state representative and former assistant attorney general

Withdrawn
 Scott Sifton, state senator (running for re-election)

Declined
 Jennifer Joyce, St. Louis Circuit Attorney
 Jason Kander, Missouri Secretary of State (running for the U.S. Senate)
 Chris Koster, incumbent Attorney General (running for Governor)
 Joe Maxwell, former Lieutenant Governor of Missouri
 Jean Peters Baker, Jackson County Prosecuting Attorney
 Mike Sanders, Jackson County Executive, former Jackson County Prosecuting Attorney and former Chairman of the Missouri Democratic Party

Endorsements

Polling

Results

Republican primary

Candidates

Declared
 Josh Hawley, law professor at University of Missouri School of Law and former clerk for United States Supreme Court Chief Justice John Roberts
 Kurt Schaefer, state senator

Declined
 Catherine Hanaway, former Speaker of the Missouri House of Representatives and former U.S. Attorney for the Eastern District of Missouri (running for Governor)
 Tim Jones, Speaker of the Missouri House of Representatives
 Eric Schmitt, state senator (running for state treasurer)

Controversy
Allegations of abuse of office by Missouri attorney general candidate Kurt Schaefer have surfaced: Schaefer allegedly pressured the former University of Missouri System President Tim Wolfe to interfere with Josh Hawley's ability to run for attorney general. Hawley was a professor at the University of Missouri. Wolfe wrote in a January 19 email: "Schaefer had several meetings with me pressuring me to take away Josh Hawley's right to run for Attorney General by taking away an employee's right to ask for an unpaid leave of absence when running for public office." The email went on to say he was worried that Schaefer might influence cuts in the university's budget due to political fallout if he did not do as Schaefer asked.

Endorsements

Polling

Results

General election

Polling

Results

See also
Missouri gubernatorial election, 2016

References

External links
Official campaign websites
 Josh Hawley for Attorney General
 Teresa Hensley for Attorney General
 Kurt Schaefer for Attorney General
 Jake Zimmerman for Attorney General

Attorney General
Missouri
Missouri Attorney General elections